AZURE Tower formerly Babillon Tower is a skyscraper under construction (currently on hold) in Batumi, Georgia. It is approximately 190 meters tall (47 stories). Once complete, it will be the tallest skyscraper in Batumi after the Orbi Twin Towers (50 stories). The Babillon Tower will become one of many new buildings constructed in Batumi in recent years, leading to a renewal of the tourist industry. The construction is overseen by Omer Ilknur and was to include a 4-star hotel, a casino, residences, social facilities, shops, offices, cafes, restaurants, and bars. 

As of May 2019, the Government of Georgia sold the Babillon Tower multi-story building to MC Construction, located in the center of Batumi. The online auction started at 24.5 million GEL, 33% less than the previous unsuccessful auction. Babylon Tower was supposed to be completed in 2015, but the developer of the project TAM GEO LLC did not fulfill their obligations.

See also 
 List of tallest buildings in Georgia (country)

References

External links 

 AZURE TOWER Interior design by Polides Architects

Buildings and structures in Batumi
Skyscrapers in Georgia (country)